The James Scott House (also known as Altholl) at 5635 Stanton Avenue in the Highland Park neighborhood of Pittsburgh, Pennsylvania, was built in 1900 in the Colonial Revival style.  A carriage house was added two years later.

James Scott was an executive for U.S. Steel and an immigrant from Scotland. The house was the starting point of an elopement covered by the national press. Scott's daughter Helen eloped on October 10, 1906, with Frederick Fairbanks, son of Vice President Charles W. Fairbanks. The couple were married on October 11 in Steubenville, Ohio and their story made the front page of the New York Times the next day.

The house was added to the National Register of Historic Places on May 30, 1997.

References

Houses on the National Register of Historic Places in Pennsylvania
Houses completed in 1900
Colonial Revival architecture in Pennsylvania
Houses in Pittsburgh
National Register of Historic Places in Pittsburgh